JoAnne Graf Field at the Seminole Softball Complex is the home field for the Florida State Seminoles softball team: it is on the campus of Florida State University in Tallahassee, Florida.

History
The Florida State Soccer/Softball Complex opened in 1999.
On April 2, 2005, former university president Dr. T.K. Wetherell and former Athletics Director, Dave Hart, officially renamed the softball stadium "JoAnne Graf Field at the Seminole Softball Complex" in honor of JoAnne Graf.

In the fall of 2007, the stadium received improvements as Florida State unveiled a new video scoreboard and a new indoor batting facility was constructed in 2011.

Advantage
Since opening in 1999, Florida State has played to the venue's home-field advantage. The Seminoles have recorded over 400 victories in their 20 years at JoAnne Graf Field. Despite the listed capacity of 1,000 seats, JoAnne Graf Field has had above capacity crowds on three occasions including a record 2,509 on May 3, 2017 against the Florida Gators, 18 years after the official opening of the complex.

See also
History of Florida State University
List of Florida State University professional athletes

References

External links
  Seminoles.com – Official website of the Florida State Seminoles softball team.

Florida State Seminoles softball
College softball venues in the United States
Sports venues in Tallahassee, Florida
1999 establishments in Florida
Sports venues completed in 1999